The Broadway cast recording of the musical My Fair Lady was released as an album by Columbia Records on the Masterworks label on April 2, 1956. The songs were composed by Frederick Loewe with lyrics by Alan Jay Lerner and conducted by Franz Allers, while the cast included stars Rex Harrison and Julie Andrews. The album became a massive seller, topping the charts on the US Billboard 200 for fifteen weeks at different times in 1956 (eight consecutive weeks), 1957, 1958 and 1959. It was the first LP record to sell 1 million copies. In the UK, upon its release in 1958, the album reached No.1 for 19 consecutive weeks and became the biggest-selling album of the year. Columbia's President, Goddard Lieberson provided the $375,000 needed to stage the show in return for the rights to the Cast recording. Columbia first reissued the album on compact disc in 1988 and it has been reissued a number of times since. It is currently available with bonus tracks.
The original cast recording had the (currently in 2018) 5th longest run ever for any album in the Billboard 200 charts with 480 weeks.
The leads of the Broadway cast re-recorded their parts for the London cast recording, which was made in stereo in 1959.

Track listing

Chart positions

 returned to number 1 on Billboard 200 at different times during 1957, 1958 and 1959.

References 

Cast recordings
Columbia Records albums
1956 albums
United States National Recording Registry recordings
Various artists albums
Albums recorded at CBS 30th Street Studio